The Good Friday Appeal is an annual fundraising activity on behalf of the Royal Children's Hospital, in Melbourne, Australia. The event occurs on Good Friday every year.

In 2022, the appeal raised over $22 million, setting a new record. More than $345 million has been raised for the hospital since the appeal began in 1931.

Individuals and businesses, clubs, schools and country towns throughout the state conduct activities to raise money for the hospital.

The appeal is a non-political, non-denominational organisation that exists solely to financially support The Royal Children's Hospital.

For the first time in 2014, the telethon was staged within the 2,500-seat Plenary theatre at the Melbourne Convention and Exhibition Centre (MCEC). The public were able to purchase tickets to join the live studio audience, with proceeds donated to the appeal. In 2016, the evening concert was marketed as a ticketed event via Ticketek.

The state-of-the-art MCEC complex, which is entirely undercover, also features a vast foyer area and support rooms which allowed the appeal to expand activities such as the popular Kids Day Out program and host community groups which fundraise for the hospital.

History
The Appeal started in 1931 when groups of journalists from The Herald and Weekly Times Ltd organised a sporting carnival in aid of Melbourne hospitals. The proceeds from the appeal initially went to different hospitals each year, but from their third-year proceeds have gone exclusively to the Melbourne Royal Children's Hospital. In 1942, Sir Keith Murdoch as managing director and editor of The Herald agreed that The Herald and radio station 3DB should broadcast an all-day appeal on Good Friday. In 1957, the Seven Network joined the appeal and presented a three-hour telethon on Good Friday afternoon. In 1960, the telethon adopted the day-long format which continues annually to this day.

During the 1960s, 1970s and 1980s, the telethon was also re-broadcast through regional Victoria via local channels, with Prime Television being the sole regional broadcaster from 1992 with the aggregation of regional markets.

Funds raised

See also
Royal Children's Hospital
Herald Sun AFL premiers poster cartoonists (Proceeds to the Good Friday Appeal)
William Ellis Green (1954–2008; including back issues 1897–1953) – raised over $2 million
Mark Knight (2009–present)

References

External links 

Donate to the Appeal

Herald Sun Shop Premiership Posters (proceeds to the Good Friday Appeal)

Culture of Melbourne
Organisations based in Melbourne
Seven Network
Australian telethons
1931 establishments in Australia
Television shows set in Melbourne